Why Should The Fire Die? is the third major album release and fifth album overall by progressive acoustic trio Nickel Creek. The album was released on Sugar Hill on August 9, 2005, in the United States, and on August 8 in the United Kingdom. Why Should the Fire Die? is the first Nickel Creek album to feature string bassist Mark Schatz. It would be their last album before their hiatus between 2007 and 2014, after which they released their album A Dotted Line.

The album peaked at No. 17 on the Billboard 200, Nickel Creek's highest position on the chart to date. Why Should the Fire Die? also topped both the magazine's Top Internet Albums and Top Bluegrass Albums charts. By November 2006, the album had sold 258,784 copies. The album earned Nickel Creek two Grammy Award nominations: the award for Best Contemporary Folk Album, an award which they previously won for This Side, and the award for Best Country Instrumental Performance ("Scotch & Chocolate").

Why Should the Fire Die? was praised by contemporary music critics primarily for its creativity, and for its instrumental quality, with one critic complimenting the album's "sheer musical brilliance".

Conception and production

In the time that Nickel Creek spent writing songs for Why Should the Fire Die?, numerous songs did not make the cut, and only fourteen were used in the final draft of the album. When discussing the album, Sean Watkins said that the band "did so much co-writing together and filtering. I mean there’s like 30 songs that didn’t get used." After writing the songs, Sara Watkins said in her online journal that the trio spent five days "going over the details of the arrangements on each of the seventeen songs we're seriously considering for the record and making good demos of each of them". The band started recording the album in November 2004, and the album was "completed, mixed, and mastered" by April 2005.

The recording for Why Should the Fire Die? took place at Barefoot Recording in Los Angeles, California. In an interview with Rolling Stone, Thile said: "The studio needs to be dark. I don't want to be reminded by my surroundings that what I'm singing about isn't happening right then. I like to really dissolve into the story. But the Jamesons I use more for keeping my vocal cords relaxed and clear."

The release of Why Should the Fire Die? marked the first major Nickel Creek release with Alison Krauss absent as a producer. The album's producing duties were carried out by Tony Berg and former Smash Mouth producer Eric Valentine. Sara Watkins stated in an interview with Paste Magazine that the producer change made for a "more congruent project overall". The band attributed much of the credit for their morphing sound to both their new producers and Krauss. The album was not recorded digitally, but in a more old-fashioned way using Telefunken microphones, and the special effects in the fiddle on the track "First and Last Waltz" was reel tape delay.

Songs
"When in Rome", the opening track on Why Should the Fire Die?, was chosen as the album's only single. The song's title alludes to the American proverb "When in Rome, do as the Romans do",  and Chris Thile, the song's author, said "The idea behind the song – and I do love it! - is if there is something better, it's worth leaning towards just a little bit because you'll have a great time here regardless." Critics commented on the song favorably, with George Graham saying that "When in Rome" has "rock energy level and some sonic manipulation, with hints of old-time Appalachian music in the fiddle, while the lyrics are definitely in the rock mode."

The second track, "Somebody More Like You" was written by guitarist Sean Watkins. The break-up song, written from Watkins' perspective, was described as "scathing", and like "Aimee Mann-style modern pop", with lyrics like "I hope you meet someone your height so you can see eye to eye/With someone as small as you". Watkins said the song wasn't written for anyone in particular, but said "I had this clever line and decided to build a song around it." "Jealous of the Moon", the third track, was co-written by Chris Thile and Gary Louris of Jayhawks fame. This song was released as a promotional single in the United States. The fourth track and first instrumental on Why Should the Fire Die?, "Scotch & Chocolate", earned Nickel Creek a Grammy Award nomination for Best Country Instrumental. However, the song lost to the trio's former record producer Alison Krauss with her band Union Station for "Unionhouse Branch", from the band's twelfth album, Lonely Runs Both Ways. As with the first three songs on the album, critics responded favorably to "Scotch & Chocolate". Rolling Stone considered the song to be "Celtic-infused", Slant Magazine named it the best song on the album, and Stylus Magazine  called it a "brisk, lively instrumental". The latter also said the song was "every bit as physically exciting as Shooter Jennings or Big and Rich."

"Can't Complain", a Chris Thile-composed piece, was the fifth track on Why Should the Fire Die?. According to Sean Watkins, the song was written by Thile "from the point of view of a friend". Unlike the first four songs on the album, the song received mixed reviews. Being There called it "nothing more than a generic ballad with little merit", and PopMatters said that it was a "one-too-many Thile tune about screwed-up relationships". However, some critics found it amazing; Village Voice called the song a "lushly arpeggiated ballad". The sixth track, a Bob Dylan cover, "Tomorrow is a Long Time", was the only track on the album not composed at least partially by one of the members of Nickel Creek. The track had previously been covered by "Watkins Family Hour", a duo that consists of Sara Watkins and Sean Watkins, at their home base of Largo in Los Angeles. Both the album version and the live Watkins Family Hour version feature Sara Watkins as the lead vocalist. Watkins was heavily praised for her "graceful" and "beautifully" sung rendition of the song. "Eveline", a tribute to the James Joyce short story of the same name, was the seventh track on the album. A Thile-Sean Watkins composed piece, "Eveline" has been said to feature "irregular tunings", and vocal harmonization that is similar to that on Radiohead's OK Computer. Allmusic cited this track as the "brooding centerpiece" of the album.

The eighth song and second instrumental on Why Should the Fire Die?, "Stumptown", was written by Chris Thile. The song was written as a tribute to Stumptown Coffee Roasters, Chris Thile's favorite coffee house in the world. "Stumptown" is also the album's shortest song, at one minute and forty three seconds. "Anthony", the ninth track, is the only song recorded by Nickel Creek that was written solely by Sara Watkins. "Anthony", which features a ukulele melody, was described by several critics to be "old-timey". One of three Thile-Watkins-Watkins composed pieces on the album, "Best Of Luck" was the tenth track on Why Should the Fire Die?. Sara Watkins had the lead vocal for "Best Of Luck", and was complimented by critics for her "snippy" and "assertive" vocal. prefix Magazine pegged the song to be the formula that makes "this album, and trio, unstoppable". The eleventh track, "Doubting Thomas", was written by Chris Thile and is named after Doubting Thomas, a biblical term. All the members of Nickel Creek came from devout Christian families, and the song is about questioning faith. The third and final instrumental, "First and Last Waltz", is Why Should the Fire Die?s twelfth track. One of the three songs written by all of Nickel Creek's members, it comes before the penultimate track, "Helena". At Nickel Creek's concerts, the song was played as a segue into "Helena". The album recording of "First And Last Waltz" has been called a "chilly effects-draped recital piece", due to its use of sound effects. "Helena", the penultimate track, was written by Chris Thile. Producer Eric Valentine provided drumming duties for this song. Thile described the track to be what he considered "the ultimate climax" of Why Should the Fire Die?, and some contemporary critics found the song to be the highlight of the album.  The final song on Why Should the Fire Die?, the title track, is a slow waltz. PopMatters described the song as being "gorgeously sung", but "an odd choice to conclude a record that is so often bidding for the true fun of pop music".

Critical reception

For the majority, Why Should the Fire Die? received positive reviews from United States contemporary music critics.  PopMatters said that the album was "hardly the stuff of mountain music", and Village Voice described it to be "much sleeker, sexier, and more carefully assembled than work by the competition." A review from the Houston Chronicle also stated that Why Should the Fire Die? is "like Wilco with country rock and Radiohead with guitar riff rock,"  and that "the trio has successfully proved the vitality of creative Darwinism." Some critics even went as far as to call the album's musical genre "emo-grass".

The album also received much critical praise for its instrumental strength, with BBC stating that "what shines through immediately is the sheer musical brilliance." The magazine Being There said that "like any good bluegrass band, Nickel Creek proves capable of playing rousing instrumentals." BBC also discussed the difference between the three instrumentals featured on the album, stating ""First And Last Waltz" is smooth and dreamy, "Stumptown" is a merry little jig, and "Scotch And Chocolate" is just reel-y (sic) good."

Reviews for Why Should the Fire Die? also included praise of the album's vocals, particularly Sara Watkins' "snippy", "beautifully sung" and "assertive" vocals on various tracks, and the trio's vocal harmonization was also complimented.

Track listing
"When in Rome" (Thile) – 4:14
"Somebody More Like You" (Sean Watkins) – 3:01
"Jealous of the Moon" (Gary Louris, Thile) – 4:41
"Scotch & Chocolate" (instrumental) (Thile, Sara Watkins) – 3:07
"Can't Complain" (Thile) – 5:34
"Tomorrow Is a Long Time" (Bob Dylan) – 3:36
"Eveline" (Thile, Sean Watkins) – 3:11
"Stumptown" (instrumental) (Thile) – 1:43
"Anthony" (Sara Watkins) – 1:55
"Best of Luck" (Thile, Sean Watkins, Sara Watkins) – 3:22
"Doubting Thomas" (Thile) – 3:19
"First and Last Waltz" (instrumental) (Thile, Sean Watkins, Sara Watkins) – 1:53
"Helena" (Thile) – 4:45
"Why Should the Fire Die?" (Thile, Sean Watkins, Sara Watkins) – 2:50

Chart performance

Personnel

Nickel Creek
Chris Thile – mandolin, vocals, mandola, bouzouki, banjo, tenor guitar, stomping
Sara Watkins – fiddle, vocals, ukulele, stomping
Sean Watkins – guitars, vocals, piano, bouzouki, stomping

Other musicians
Mark Schatz – bass, stomping
Eric Valentine – drums

Credits

Producers: Tony Berg, Eric Valentine
Engineer: Eric Valentine
Assistant engineer: Chris Roach
Mixing: Eric Valentine
Mastering: Eric Valentine
Creative director: Wendy Stamberger
Photography: Danny Clinch
Stylist: Marjan Malakpour
Assistants: Gary Ashley, Brett Williams

References

External links
 Why Should the Fire Die? at Nickel Creek's official website, with sound samples and video

Nickel Creek albums
2005 albums
Albums produced by Eric Valentine
Albums produced by Tony Berg
Sugar Hill Records albums